Men's Combined World Cup 2004/2005

Calendar

For the first time the combined was held as a separate event.

Final point standings

In Men's Combined World Cup 2004/05 only one competition was held.

No more finishers in time.

Men's Combined Team Results

bold indicate highest score - italics indicate race wins

References

World Cup
FIS Alpine Ski World Cup men's combined discipline titles